Urapmin may refer to:
 Urapmin people
 Urapmin language